Catonephele sabrina is a butterfly of the family Nymphalidae.

Description
The basic colour of the uppersides of the wings is dark brown, with broad orange bands on the forewings and on the hindwings. On the top of the forewings there are large orange spots.

Distribution
This species occurs in Colombia and Brazil.

References
"Catonephele sabrina (Hewitson, 1851)" at Markku Savela's Lepidoptera and Some Other Life Forms

External links
Butterflies of America

Biblidinae
Fauna of Brazil
Nymphalidae of South America
Butterflies described in 1852